The Roman Catholic Archdiocese of Jos (Archidioecesis Iosensis (Latin)  is the Metropolitan See for the Ecclesiastical province of Jos in Nigeria.

History 
 1934.04.09: Established as Apostolic Prefecture of Jos from the Apostolic Prefecture of Northern Nigeria
 1953.06.29: Promoted as Diocese of Jos
 1994.03.26: Promoted as Metropolitan Archdiocese of Jos

Special churches 
The seat of the archbishop is Cathedral of Our Lady of Fatima in Jos.

Bishops 
 Prefects Apostolic of Jos (Roman rite)
 Fr. Guglielmo Lumley, S.M.A. 1934.06.22 – 1953
  Bishops of Jos (Roman rite)
 Bishop John J. Reddington, S.M.A. 1954.04.10 – 1974.07.03
 Bishop Gabriel Gonsum Ganaka 1974.10.05 – 1994.03.26 see below
 Metropolitan Archbishops of Jos (Roman rite)
 Archbishop Gabriel Gonsum Ganaka see above 1994.03.26 – 1999.11.11
 Archbishop Ignatius Ayau Kaigama 2000.04.14 - 2019.03.11; as President of the Nigerian Bishops, he has criticized the government for its failure to adequately protect Christians and other religious minorities from Islamist fundamentalist terrorists, such as Boko Haram
 Archbishop Matthew Ishaya Audu since 2020.01.06

Auxiliary Bishop
Gabriel Gonsum Ganaka (1973-1974), appointed Bishop here

Other priests of this diocese who became bishops
Kevin Joseph Aje, appointed Coadjutor Bishop of Sokoto in 1982
Oliver Dashe Doeme (priest here, 1997-2007), appointed Bishop of Maiduguri in 2009
Philip Davou Dung, appointed Bishop of Shendam in 2016
Michael Gobal Gokum, appointed Bishop of Pankshim in 2014
Malachy John Goltok, appointed Bishop of Bauchi in 2011

Suffragan dioceses 
 Bauchi
 Jalingo
 Maiduguri
 Pankshin
 Shendam
 Yola
 Wukari

See also 
 Roman Catholicism in Nigeria

References

External links
 GCatholic.org

Jos
Plateau State
1934 establishments in Nigeria
Christian organizations established in 1934
Roman Catholic Ecclesiastical Province of Jos